WPXS (channel 13) is a religious television station licensed to Mount Vernon, Illinois, United States (a city within the Paducah, Kentucky–Cape Girardeau, Missouri–Harrisburg, Illinois television market), but primarily serving the St. Louis market. The station is owned and operated by the Daystar Television Network. WPXS' transmitter is located on Five Forks Road near New Athens, Illinois.

History

Southern Illinois's independent
Channel 13 at Mount Vernon—the last VHF television allocation in southern Illinois, added in 1970 after a years-long fight that depleted the resources of the aspiring station owners—emerged as a bone of contention when the Southern Illinois Broadcasting Corporation, a subsidiary of Evans Broadcasting, was granted a construction permit in 1979. Southern Illinois Broadcasting had been one of three competing applicants for the channel, alongside a group of local businessmen and Bill Varecha, owner of Murphysboro radio station WTAO, under the name Pyramid Broadcasting Corporation. Evans fueled a prolonged legal fight that prompted Varecha to reach a settlement agreement. However, opposition arose because Evans Broadcasting owned St. Louis independent station KDNL-TV and intended for channel 13 to repeat it 95 percent of the time. A local landowner who owned a strategically located parcel that Evans considered for the transmitter refused to lease it. The landowner and others formed the Citizens Committee for Independent Local Television in Southern Illinois to oppose the grant of the permit. Evans argued that Mount Vernon, a town with a population of 18,000, could not sustain the station, and that national advertising revenues would be poor since the station would be located in the St. Louis market without covering St. Louis.

Evans pressed ahead despite the opposition. It had segments of a  tower waiting at a site near Salem when the FCC, responding to the Citizens Committee's appeals, rescinded the grant of the permit. In early 1980, however, it sold KDNL-TV and announced it was pulling out of contention for channel 13, saying it wanted to avoid "years of litigation". The Pyramid application was reinstated in 1981, and in June 1982, the FCC granted it a construction permit.

WCEE, known on air as "C-13", began broadcasting February 28, 1983. Its program schedule heavily emphasized programming of interest to southern Illinois viewers that St. Louis stations did not offer; channel 13 aired the Chicago White Sox, Chicago Cubs, and Illinois high school and college sports, and it started a local news department. After operating the station nearly three years, Pyramid sold WCEE to Sudbrink Broadcasting for $3.6 million in late 1985. The sale of the station, which was struggling with cable carriage but financially successful, raised capital for Varecha to build television stations in Melbourne, Florida, and Paducah, Kentucky; it also marked Sudbrink's first television property.

Under Sudbrink, the station remained an independent airing programming oriented to southern Illinois. In 1994, WCEE was purchased by McEntee Broadcasting for $1.475 million.

Pax years

Christian Network, a company backed by Lowell Paxson, bought WCEE from McEntee in 1995 for $3.2 million, representing a doubling of the purchase price McEntee had paid just a year prior. A year later, WPXS and three other Christian Network stations were sold to Paxson Communications—the forerunner of Ion Media Networks—for $18.3 million.

As part of the launch of the Pax TV network in 1998, WCEE became the designated St. Louis station. It changed its call sign to the current WPXS and began simulcasting on a translator in St. Louis, KUMO-LP (channel 40, later 51). The WPXS transmitter, which was located north of Kell, Illinois, was close enough to St. Louis to cover most of the Illinois portion of the St. Louis market; St. Louis itself was served by KUMO-LP.

Equity and Daystar
In 2004, the station affiliated with the Daystar religious broadcast network. The following year, Equity Broadcasting bought the station from Paxson; WPXS subsequently rejoined Pax (which rebranded as i: Independent Television that summer, and then to Ion Television in 2007).

In 2005, WPXS affiliated with the Retro Television Network, a network owned by Equity at the time. By this time, the bulk of the station's audience was located in St. Louis. In 2010, Daystar purchased WPXS outright; this resulted in the station switching back to the network on August 12 of that year. With that move, DirecTV pulled WPXS from its St. Louis local station lineup on September 11, 2010, as WPXS had become a straight simulcast of Daystar's national feed (unlike fellow religious network, TBN, Daystar's television stations do not produce any local programming). On Dish Network, the provider lists Daystar programming as airing on WPXS, though the provider continues to offer the Retro Television Network feed.

Technical information
The station's digital signal is multiplexed:

Analog-to-digital conversion
WPXS opted to build its digital transmitter in Saint Rose, Illinois, which is part of the St. Louis market. The station shut down its analog signal, over VHF channel 13, on April 30, 2009. The station's digital signal continued to broadcast on its pre-transition UHF channel 21. Through the use of PSIP, digital television receivers display the station's virtual channel as its former VHF analog channel 13.

The station's signal now covers areas of the St. Louis market east of the Mississippi River, including Belleville, Edwardsville and Alton, Illinois. After the switchover, the broadcast radius of WPXS' digital signal covered a smaller area than the former analog signal, resulting in the loss of the station's reception to nearly 93,000 viewers in Effingham, Clay and Wayne counties and large portions of Franklin, Hamilton, Jefferson, Jasper, Richland and Shelby counties in Illinois. KUMO-LD flash-cut its digital signal into operation in June 2011, without an RTV subchannel. Although WPXS' digital transmitter creates redundancies with KUMO-LP on the Illinois side of the St. Louis market, the transmitter still provides only rimshot coverage of the Missouri side of the market, most likely due to the need to protect the transmitter of KRCG in Jefferson City on nearby digital channel 12.

References

External links
FCC Decision on WCEE must-carry in the St. Louis area

Daystar (TV network) affiliates
Retro TV affiliates
Television stations in St. Louis
Equity Media Holdings
Television channels and stations established in 1983
1983 establishments in Illinois
Television stations in the Paducah–Cape Girardeau–Harrisburg market